The 2013–14 Munster Rugby season was Munster's thirteenth season competing in the Pro12 alongside which they also competed in the Heineken Cup for the nineteenth time. It was Rob Penney's second and final season as head coach.

Coaching & management staff 2013–14
The Munster Coaching and Management staff for the 2013–14 season.

Senior playing squad 2013–14
The Munster Senior Squad for the 2013–2014 season.

Internationally capped players in bold.
Players qualified to play for Ireland on residency or dual nationality. *

Senior players in (season 2013/14)
Niall Scannell promoted from Academy
Duncan Casey promoted from Academy
James Cronin promoted from Academy
Gerry Hurley
Cian Bohane promoted from Academy
Andrew Conway from Leinster
Ronan O'Mahony promoted from Academy
Gerhard van den Heever from Western Province/Stormers

Senior players out (season 2013/14)
Seán Henry to Connacht
Marcus Horan Retiring 
Wian du Preez to Free State Cheetahs
Christy Condon to released
Peter Stringer to Bath
Scott Deasy to released
Ronan O'Gara Retiring 
Danny Barnes to Newcastle Falcons
Doug Howlett Retiring due to injury 
Seán Scanlon to Rotherham

2013–14 Pro12
Munster reached the semi-finals of the Pro 12 and faced the Glasgow Warriors at Scotstoun Stadium on 16 May.		
Glasgow won the match 16-15 to reach the final against Leinster who defeated Ulster 13-9 the day after.

2013–14 Heineken Cup
On 19 January, Munster secured a home quarter-final in the knock-out stages of the 2013–14 Heineken Cup after a 38–6 win against Edinburgh at Thomond Park. They faced Toulouse in the quarter-finals on 5 April.
Munster scored six tries to beat Toulouse 43-23 and reach the semi-finals.
A Keith Earls's try put Munster into a 10-point lead before two Luke McAlister penalties made it 13–9 at half time. Tries from Dave Kilcoyne and CJ Stander looked to have sealed the victory before Toulouse relied with a try from Hosea Gear. Further tries from Casey Laulala, Simon Zebo and Paul O'Connell made it a comfortable win in the end for Munster. CJ Stander, who replaced the injured Peter O'Mahony in the first half was named Man of the Match. 

On 27 April in the semi-final against Toulon at the Stade Vélodrome, Munster lost 24–16.
Munster came from 18-9 down at half-time to score the game's only try through Simon Zebo who went over in the corner.
Jonny Wilkinson scored 21 points for Toulon.

Quarter-final

Semi-final

Related
2013–14 Connacht Rugby season

References

External links
2013–14 Munster Rugby season at official site
2013-14 Pro 12 Fixtures and Results at rabodirectpro12
2013-14 Heineken Cup Fixtures and Results at ercrugby

2013–14
2013–14 Pro12 by team
2013–14 in Irish rugby union
2013–14 Heineken Cup by team